HEV or variation, may refer to:

Transportation
 HÉV, a system of suburban railway lines in Budapest, Hungary
 Hever railway station (rail code: HEV), in England, UK
 Hybrid electric vehicle (HEV)
Hydrogen electric vehicle
 Hummer EV (Hev), the GM Hummer electric vehicle, an all-electric offroading pickup truck

Biology
 Hendra virus (HeV)
 Hepatitis E virus (HEV)
 High endothelial venules (HEV)
 Hevein (protein) (hev)

Other uses
 High-energy visible light
 Hazardous Environment Suit, worn by the protagonist of the Half-Life video game series

See also